Calliostoma aulicum is a species of sea snail, a marine gastropod mollusk in the family Calliostomatidae.

Description
The height of the shell attains 16 mm. The umbilical shell has a conical shape and is finely sculptured. The teleoconch contains 7.5 concave whorls. The color of the shell is ivory with a few, faint patches of golden brown.

Distribution
This species occurs in the Caribbean Sea off Panama, eastern Venezuela, Suriname and Trinidad at depths between 12 mm and 48 m.

References

 Quinn, J. F., Jr. 1992. New species of Calliostoma Swainson, 1840 (Gastropoda: Trochidae), and notes on some poorly known species from the Western Atlantic Ocean. Nautilus 106: 77-114

External links
 To Biodiversity Heritage Library (1 publication)
 To Encyclopedia of Life
 To USNM Invertebrate Zoology Mollusca Collection
 To World Register of Marine Species

aulicum
Gastropods described in 1992